Verona Apartments may refer to:

 Verona Apartments (Springfield, Massachusetts), listed on the NRHP in Hampden County
Verona Apartments (Detroit), listed on the National Register of Historic Places in Wayne County
Verona Apartments (Cincinnati, Ohio), listed on the National Register of Historic Places in Hamilton County